The Cuban Cycling Federation or FCC (in Spanish: Federación Cubana de Ciclismo) is the national governing body of cycle racing in Cuba.

The FCC is a member of the UCI and COPACI.

References

1964 establishments in Cuba
Sports organizations established in 1964
Organizations based in Havana
Sports governing bodies in Cuba
Cycle racing organizations
Cycle racing in Cuba